Dehipitiyage Don Somasiri (born January 29, 1933 – died April 27,1982), popularly as Somasiri Dehipitiya, was a popular Sri Lankan character actor. He is best known for performances in Dharmasena Pathiraja and Vasantha Obeysekera films.

Personal life
Dehipitiya was born on January 29, 1933, in Gampaha, Sri Lanka. His father, Wilson Dehipitiya worked in the Railway Department. His mother Catherine Wingasinghe was a housewife. He completed education from Gampaha Primary School and later at Galahitiyawa Central College. After completing his primary education, he began work as a civil servant eventually reaching a position at the Vehicles Department - Colombo in the engineer division. While appearing in cinema and theatre, he professionally worked as a store keeper in the Irrigation Department.

His younger brother, Chandrasiri Dehipitiya was also a renowned actor, art director and sculptor. Chandrasiri was the artistic director of the film 'Ves Gatto'. He was also a member of the choir in the play 'Maname'. Chandrasiri died on 9 December 2020. Dehipitiya was married to his longtime partner Rupa Ranasinghe who worked as a dance teacher in government schools and also acted as a dancer in about four films including Laa Dalu and Akkara Paha. He was a father of one son: Damith Sirilal, and one daughter: Nayananjali, who specializes in advertising as well as film costume design. Damith is a Regional Manager at a private bank who is three years older than Nayananjali.

In 1981, he suffered from jaundice. He died of alcoholism in 1982.

Career
He displayed his artistic talents since the age of ten, where in 1951 he greeted the then Prime Minister DS Senanayake with a warm welcome who came to his college. He later moved to drama and later won the Best Actor award for his role in Manamula at the 1954 School Drama Competition. Somasiri then entered radio at a young age with many talents. He once played the flute and at one time exhibited his talents as a radio dramatist. Meanwhile, veteran radio artist Gemunu Wijesuriya saw his talent and took steps to introduce Somasiri to the public stage.

He started to act in stage plays such as Mati Karaththaya, Rathnawali produced by P. Welikala as well as Mahagamasekera's Kundalakeshi, Swarnahansi. Then he joined Ediriweera Sarachchandra for his numerous stage plays such as Pabawathi, Raththaran, Elowa Gihin Melowa Awa and Kundala Keshi. Then he acted in Dayananda Gunawardena's Ibi Katta, Amathi Pattama, and Neil Wijesinghe's Ane Massine.

Dehipitiya made his acting debut in Siri Gunasinghe's landmark Sath Samudura in 1967. Throughout the 1970s and early-1980s, he was a mainstay in alternative cinema with roles in such critically acclaimed works as Thun Man Handiya (1970), Ves Gatho (1970), Hara Lakshaya (1971), Ahas Gauwa (1974), Sihasuna (1974), Walmath Wuvo (1977), Deviyani Oba Koheda (1977), Eya Dan Loku Lamayek (1977), Bambaru Awith (1978), Anupama (1978), Sarungale (1979), Podi Malli (1979), Siribo Aiyya (1980), Para Dige (1980), Karumakarayo (1980), Soldadu Unnahe (1981), Sagarayak Meda (1981) and Ridi Nimnaya (1982).

Dehipitiya also dabbled as an assistant director with Ves Gatho in 1970 and as a playback singer in Walmath Wuvo with Cyril Wickramage. In 1980, Dehipitiya won the award for the Best Supporting Actor for his role in Siribo Ayya in Presidential Award Ceremony.

Legacy
The 40th Commemoration Ceremony was held on Saturday 23rd at 3.00 pm at the Tharangani Hall of the National Film Corporation. After that, the film Diyamanthi was screened.

Filmography

References

External links 
Sri Lanka Sinhala Films Database - Somasiri Dehipitiya

1933 births
1982 deaths
Sri Lankan male film actors
Sinhalese male actors 
20th-century Sri Lankan male singers
20th-century Sri Lankan male actors